Hadipora is a village in Baramulla district, Jammu and Kashmir. The village is known as the 'Heart of Rafiabad' as it is surrounded by the main villages of Rafiabad like Achabal, Rebban, Chatloora, Lasser and Chigham.
This village is accessible by the National Highway  which connects it to Handwara, Kupwara and other northern regions of Kashmir.

Education
This village has one Middle School, one Higher Secondary School and a Govt Degree College. Govt Degree College Hadipora (Rafiabad), a newly established college, is just one kilometer away from the National Highway that leads to Kupwara and northern regions of Kashmir.

Religion
All the people of this village are Muslims. This village has two Jamia Masjids and other nine mosques.

Playground
Hadipora playground is the centre of attraction for all the cricket and football fans of Rafiabad. Moreover, there are two big Chinars in this playground which lend picturesque look to this ground.

Healthcare
This village has one Govt Hospital which fails to provide even basic health facilities to the inhabitants of this village.

References

Cities and towns in Baramulla district